William Mills (10 November 1750 – 20 March 1820) was a British Member of Parliament and Director, East India Company.

John Mills was the eldest son of the Revd. John Mills, rector of Barford and Oxhill, Warwickshire and educated at Felsted School. He inherited Warden's Hall, High Ongar, Essex from his Uncle William in 1782 and succeeded his father in 1791.

He served as a director of the East India Company from 1778 to 1785. He was elected MP for St Ives in 1790, sitting until 1796 and for Coventry for 1805 to 1812. He was appointed High Sheriff of Hampshire for 1803–04.

He married Elizabeth, the daughter of Hon. Wriothesley Digby of Coleshill and Meriden Hall, Warwickshire; they had 6 sons and 3 daughters. His eldest son John was also an MP.

References

 

1750 births
1820 deaths
Members of the Parliament of Great Britain for English constituencies
British MPs 1790–1796
Members of the Parliament of the United Kingdom for English constituencies
UK MPs 1802–1806
UK MPs 1807–1812
High Sheriffs of Hampshire
Directors of the British East India Company
Members of Parliament for Coventry